Comrock is the name of a record label created in Mexico in the 1980s that was dedicated to promoting rock bands. It was coordinated by Ricardo Ochoa, guitar player of Kenny y los Eléctricos, and brought a wide audience to many Mexican bands. Five finalist bands were selected to obtain a recording contract for an LP. Two songs from each of these finalist bands were included on the compilation disk.

The name of the label came from a fusion of the words "compañía" (company) and "rock", and meant "the rock company".

The groups were:
 Ritmo Peligroso
 Kenny y los Eléctricos
 Mask
 Los Clips
 Punto y Aparte
 Luzbel
 El Tri

Both Ritmo Peligroso and Kenny y los Eléctricos changed their names; originally they were named Dangerous Rhythm and Kenny & the Electrics. But Mexican groups began to be criticized for using English names.

The compilation disk 
 Ritmo Peligroso
Ritmo Peligroso and vocalist Piro found commercial success. Their contributions to the album were Marielito and Modern Minds.
 Kenny y los Eléctricos
Kenny, the primary singer, and the other members of the group Kenny y los Eléctricos also participated in concerts in Los Angeles and in the Palacio de los Deportes in Mexico City. Me quieres cotorrear and A woman in love were those included in the final cut from this group.

 Mask
Another of the groups that participated in the recording of the disk was Mask, which contributed I'm the Fox and Going Down, a very fine heavy metal cut. Its vocalist, José Fors, in 1989 founded La Cuca.
 Los Clips
Los Clips contributed the song titled El Final; this song has been interpreted by Rostros Ocultos, a group fronted by singer Cala, who was a vocalist for the Clips, as Una Buena Leccion.
 Punto y Aparte
Punto y Aparte contributed the song titled Don´t Cry for the Radio considered by many an excellent pop rock cut, fresh and fine. Its other contribution to the disk was Heart Break.

 Luzbel
Luzbel was one of the most representative Mexican rock bands, although the label only released their first three albums. Metal caído del cielo, Pasaporte al infierno and Luzbel, left a huge legacy for all of their fans since the quality of their music was always very high. They became famous in the 80s and 90s, becoming one of the best and most successful metal bands of their time, with songs that became classics, like El loco, La gran ciudad, Pasaporte al infierno, Por piedad, Criaturas de la noche, Souvenir and Paradoja, among others.

Mexican record labels
Rock record labels